McMullin is a surname. Notable people with the surname include:

Alister McMullin (1900–1984), Australian politician
Dale McMullin (born 1955), Canadian ice hockey player
David McMullin (1908–1995), American field hockey player
Ernan McMullin, professor at the University of Notre Dame
Evan McMullin, (born 1976), candidate for President of the United States in the 2016 presidential election
Fred McMullin (1891–1952), American baseball player
Ian McMullin (born 1964), Australian rules footballer
Keith B. McMullin (born 1941), Latter Day Saints bishop
Peter McMullin (born 1952), Australian politician